The Journal of Obstetrics and Gynaecology is an international peer-reviewed medical journal that publishes original research and review articles on the entire field of obstetrics and gynecology, with an emphasis on practical applicability. The journal publishes a wide range of papers, including scientific and clinical research, reviews, case reports, and supplements on clinical symposia.

Editor 
Allan Bruce MacLean, is the Editor of Journal of Obstetrics and Gynaecology. MacLean is a professor of Obstetrics and Gynaecology at the University College London Medical School.

References 

Publications established in 1980
Obstetrics and gynaecology journals